It's All Good is the seventh solo studio album by the Flint, Michigan-based hip hop recording artist and producer MC Breed. It was released on February 9, 1999, via Power Records with distribution by Roadrunner Records/RED Distribution. Production was handled by MC Breed, Colin Wolfe, Jazze Pha, Erotic D and Mr. Ku. It features guest appearances from 2Pac, DFC, Too $hort, Pimp C, Mr. Ku, Kurupt and Jazze Pha. After seven years with Wrap Records, this MC Breed's first album with Power Records. Breed returned to the Billboard 200 with this album, as the album peaked at No. 180 on the chart as well as placing at No. 41 on the Top R&B/Hip-Hop Albums chart.

Track listing

Charts

References

External links

1999 albums
MC Breed albums
Albums produced by Jazze Pha
Roadrunner Records albums